Sir Benjamin Clive Freedman (born 16 November 1955), commonly called The Honourable Mr Justice Freedman is a British barrister and High Court judge.

Life 
Freedman was educated at Manchester Grammar School and Pembroke College, Cambridge (1974–77).  He was called to the bar, Middle Temple, in 1978 and took silk in 1997.  As a barrister, Freedman worked on a number of high profile cases.  He was a Recorder between 2000 and 2018 and a Deputy High Court judge between 2003 and 2018.  He was appointed as a Justice of the High Court assigned to the Queen's Bench in October 2018.  He was knighted in June 2019.

Notes 

1955 births
People educated at Manchester Grammar School
Alumni of Pembroke College, Cambridge
British barristers
21st-century English judges
Knights Bachelor
Living people